The United Kingdom returned to compete in the Junior Eurovision Song Contest 2022 in Armenia, which was held on 11 December 2022 in Yerevan. On 25 August 2022, the British Broadcasting Corporation (BBC) announced that the country would return to the contest after a sixteen-year absence, replacing ITV who previously organised the country’s participation in the contest between 2003 and 2005. Freya Skye was selected as the UK entrant with the song "Lose My Head".

Skye performed twelfth in the running order, following the entry from Spain and preceding the entry from Portugal. The United Kingdom placed fifth with 146 points, winning the online vote with 80 points.

Background 

Prior to the 2022 contest, the United Kingdom had participated in the Junior Eurovision Song Contest three times since its first entry in the inaugural contest in 2003, with their best result being in  when they finished in second position with the song "The Best is Yet to Come", performed by Cory Spedding. The United Kingdom was due to host the event in Manchester in 2004, but pulled out due to financial and scheduling issues. The song ended 14th out of 16 entries with 28 points.

The UK did not appear on the official list of participants as released by the European Broadcasting Union (EBU) on 8 September 2020. However, once again the UK did not appear on the final list of participants for the contest in Paris. On 17 December 2021, at a press conference between France Télévisions and the executive supervisor of the Junior Eurovision Song Contest Martin Österdahl, Österdahl stated that he was positive about talks between the EBU and the BBC about a potential UK return. On 25 August 2022, it was confirmed that the UK would return for the 2022 contest in Yerevan, with the BBC replacing ITV as the country’s participating broadcaster.

Before Junior Eurovision 
Upon the broadcaster's announcement that they would participate in the Junior Eurovision Song Contest 2022, Patricia Hidalgo Reina, director of BBC Children's and Education, stated:

The song representing the United Kingdom had been chosen by the British head of delegation, Lee Smithurst, out of a pool of shortlisted songs, and CBBC, together with BBC Studios Entertainment and Music, who were tasked with selecting a singer in co-operation with the British commercial talent agency Buzz Kids. In order to select the British artist to the 2022 contest in Yerevan, a two-stage audition process was held, which commenced in September 2022 and forty artists were invited to attend. The first stage involved all artists singing a cover song of their choice and an original song, of which eight were selected to progress to the second stage. The second stage involved the remaining eight artists performing the selected entry "Lose My Head". A jury panel consisting of music professionals determined the winner of the auditions and, hence who would represent the United Kingdom at the Junior Eurovision Song Contest 2022.

On 3 November 2022, it was officially revealed to the public that Freya Skye would represent the country with the song "Lose My Head", written by Jack Hawitt, Amber van Day and Falco van den Aker. Skye went to the Apollo Victoria Theatre in London under the pretext of a final audition, only to be surprised by West End Theatre performer and the UK's 2017 Eurovision entrant Lucie Jones, who broke the news to Skye that she had been selected to represent the UK in Armenia.

Preparation and promotion 
Dan Shipton, who had designed several previous Eurovision stagings, including for Sam Ryder, the British runner-up for the United Kingdom in the Eurovision Song Contest 2022, was again the creative director, while Jay Revell was the lead choreographer and Jorge Antonio was the assistant choreographer and costume designer for the performance. Annabel Williams was Skye’s lead vocal coach, having previously coached Sam Ryder and James Newman for the UK at the Eurovision Song Contest and having experience as the lead vocal coach on The X Factor UK and Britain’s Got Talent. Williams has also worked alongside the likes of Amy Winehouse and Jennifer Hudson.

Following the reveal of the UK entry, Skye embarked on several promotional activities, appearing on BBC Breakfast and The Zoe Ball Breakfast Show on BBC Radio 2 on 3 November. Skye also appeared on CBBC’s Newsround, BBC Radio 5 Live and Fun Kids. On 18 November, Freya Skye gave her first live TV performance of "Lose My Head" on the BBC's annual charity appeal show Children in Need. On 26 November, Skye performed live on CBBC's Saturday Mash-Up! and three days later on BBC Two's Strictly Come Dancing: It Takes Two. On 8 December, CBBC broadcast a 30-minute documentary Freya's Journey, which followed her journey to the contest.

At Junior Eurovision 
The Junior Eurovision Song Contest 2022 took place at the Karen Demirchyan Sports and Concerts Complex in Yerevan, Armenia on 11 December 2022, at 15:00 GMT. The event will be broadcast live on CBBC, BBC One and on the BBC iPlayer. On 21 November, it was announced that children's TV presenter Lauren Layfield and singer Hrvy would commentate the BBC's coverage of the contest from MediaCity in Salford.

Freya Skye and the UK delegation also participated in the Opening Ceremony for the contest, which was held in Republic Square in Yerevan on 5 December, during which the running order was also determined. The United Kingdom was drawn by the show producers to perform in 12th position, following the entry from Spain and preceding the entry from Portugal.

Just over 700,000 watched Junior Eurovision in the UK, an audience size similar to when ITV last participated in 2005.

Rehearsals 

Due to Freya falling ill during the week, she was unable to sing live during her second rehearsal, using playback instead, and pulled out of the jury show on 10 December, as doctors had advised her to rest her voice.

Performance 
The live performance for the UK entry in Yerevan featured similarities to the music video for the song, with Freya joined by four backing dancers, all of whom wore red dresses. A large custom-made throne, along with Alice in Wonderland-inspired LEDs, red lighting, and pyrotechnics made up the staging.

Dan Shipton, who had designed several previous Eurovision stagings, including for Sam Ryder, the British runner-up for the United Kingdom in the Eurovision Song Contest 2022, was again the creative director, while Jay Revell was the lead choreographer and Jorge Antonio was the assistant choreographer and costume designer for the performance. Annabel Williams was Skye’s lead vocal coach, having previously coached Sam Ryder and James Newman for the UK at the Eurovision Song Contest and having experience as the lead vocal coach on The X Factor UK and Britain’s Got Talent. Williams has also worked alongside the likes of Amy Winehouse and Jennifer Hudson.

Voting 

The United Kingdom received 66 points from the professional juries, placing in fifth position. The country placed first in the online vote, with 80 points. Overall, the United Kingdom placed in fifth place with 146 points, receiving maximum twelve points from Ukraine in the jury vote.

Detailed voting results
Each nation's jury consisted of five members: three adult music industry professionals and two children, who are citizens of the country they represent. This jury judged each entry based on: vocal capacity; the stage performance; the song's composition and originality; and the overall impression by the act. In addition, no member of a national jury was permitted to be related in any way to any of the competing acts in such a way that they cannot vote impartially and independently. The individual rankings of each jury member as well as the nation's televoting results were released shortly after the contest.

References 

United Kingdom
2022
Junior Eurovision Song Contest